Marneuli is a municipality in Georgia, in the region of Kvemo Kartli. Its administrative center and main town is Marneuli.

Location 
Marneuli Municipality is situated in south-east part of country near to border with Azerbaijan and Armenia. The size of the municipality is 935 km2. Most part of its territory is located in Marneuli lowland (between 350 and 600 meters above sea level). The highest point is Garadagh mountain (1416 m.).

Geography and Climate
Marneuli municipality is located in the eastern part of Kvemo Kartli. Its administrative center is the city of Marneuli. Marneuli borders Bolnisi Municipality to the west, Tetritskaro Municipality to the north, Gardabani Municipality to the northeast, Azerbaijan and Armenia to the south. The central part of the municipality is surrounded by the accumulated plains of Marneuli. The Iaghluji highland forms the geographic northern boundary of the municipality, while the southern geographic boundary is shaped by the Babakari Ridge. The area of the municipality is characterized by a river network that flows from west to east into the Mtkvari bassin. The river Mtkvari flows along the eastern border of Marneuli. Other main rivers through the municipality are the Khrami and Algeti which join the Mtkvari river near the Azerbaijan border.

Flora and fauna in Marneuli are diverse. In the area beard grass, thorny steppe, sparse, floodplain and semi-desert vegetation are common. Widespread medlar, sea buckthorn, maple, Georgian oak, blackthorn, etc. In the forests are inhabited badgers, wild boars, white breasted marten and others. In Marneuli almost everywhere can be found reed cat, rabbits, wolves and others. Ornithofauna is also abundant in the region, where you will find pheasants, partridge, partridge, skylark and many other birds. In the Marneuli municipality there is moderately dry subtropical warm steppe climate, with hot summers and mild cold winters. The average annual temperature is 12 °C, 0-0.3 °C in January and 24 °C in July.

Administrative divisions
Marneuli Municipality is administratively divided into 17 communities (თემი, temi) with 77 villages (სოფელი, sopeli). There is one city (ქალაქი, kalaki). In 54 villages predominate ethnic Azeris, in 12 – Armenians, in 11 – Georgians.

 city: Marneuli;
 daba: none;
 villages: 77, such as Sadakhlo, Kizilajlo, Shaumiani, Akhkerpi, Aghmamedlo, Akhkula, Khojorni and Tekali.

The municipality has relatively large villages, which would have been labeled a daba in other municipalities. The two largest villages Sadakhlo and Kizilajlo have more than 7,000 residents. The former district capital Shaumiani was downgraded from daba to village in 2014.

Population
The population of Marneuli Municipality is 107,824 according to the 2021 estimate, which is 3% increase from the last census of 2014 (104,300). The ethnic composition is 83.8% Azerbaijani, 8.6% Georgians and 7.0% Armenian. Small minority groups include Russians (0.2%) and Greek (0.1%). The population density is 115.3 people per square kilometer.

Politics
Marneuli Municipal Assembly (Georgian: მარნეულის საკრებულო) is the representative body in Marneuli Municipality, consisting of 33 members which are elected every four years. The last election was held in October 2021. Kenan Omarov of Georgian Dream was elected as mayor.

Economy 
After the collapse of Soviet Union economy of Marneuli broke down in ways similar to other regions of country. Soviet economic policies employed people in industries that could not survive competition in a free market and encouraged industrialization in areas where it did not belong. The Marneuli area is littered with polluted and abandoned factories that are the remnants of Soviet economic policy. At present Marneuli is known as agricultural region. In 2006 Marneuli owned share 78% of tobacco, 11% of vegetables and 4% of meat production around the Georgia. The largest employer in the Marneuli area is the Marneuli Food Company which bottles and sells items like pickles and ketchup.

Culture 
At present in Marneuli it is functioning 87 state and 1 non-state secondary school, 4 college, 4 high education enterprises (university), 67 libraries, 2 theaters, 2 museums and 1 TV.

Cultural Monuments

 The Monastery Complex - Khujabi
 Tserakvi Monastery Complex
 Tsopi Fortress in Sadakhlo
 Khojorna Church in Khojorni
 Binadzori Complex
 Shulaveri Fortress

Gallery

References

Municipalities of Kvemo Kartli